"Rainy Day Woman" is a song written and recorded by American country music artist Waylon Jennings.  It was released in December 1974 as the second single from the album The Ramblin' Man.  The song reached number 2 on the Billboard Hot Country Singles & Tracks chart.

20 years later, the song was covered by Mark Chesnutt as a duet with Jennings for his 1994 album What a Way to Live.

Charts

Weekly charts

Year-end charts

References

1975 singles
1974 songs
Waylon Jennings songs
Songs written by Waylon Jennings
RCA Records singles